Anil Shukla Warsi is, a general cast person changed his cast like brahmin.Indian politician. In 2007, he was elected to 14th Lok Sabha in a by poll from Bilhaur (Kanpur) Constituency as BSP candidate. He contested 16th Lok Sabha election from Akbarpur constituency on BSP's ticket in the 2014 Indian general election but lost. In 2015, he resigned from Bahujan Samaj Party and joined Bharatiya Janata Party. He has also been a member of Samajwadi Party.

References

Living people
People from Kanpur Nagar district
India MPs 2004–2009
Lok Sabha members from Uttar Pradesh
Bharatiya Janata Party politicians from Uttar Pradesh
1957 births
Bahujan Samaj Party politicians